The I Ching book consists of 64 hexagrams.

A hexagram in this context is a figure composed of six stacked horizontal lines (爻 yáo), where each line is either Yang (an unbroken, or solid line), or Yin (broken, an open line with a gap in the center). The hexagram lines are traditionally counted from the bottom up, so the lowest line is considered line one while the top line is line six. Hexagrams are formed by combining the original eight trigrams in different combinations. Each hexagram is accompanied with a description, often cryptic, akin to parables. Each line in every hexagram is also given a similar description.

The Chinese word for a hexagram is 卦 "guà", although that also means trigram.

Types

Classic and modern I Ching commentaries mention a number of different hexagram types:
 Eight Trigrams
 Original Hexagram
 Future Hexagram
 Contrasting (Reverse) Hexagram (is found by turning a hexagram upside down)
 Complementary Hexagram (is found by changing all the lines into their opposite)
 Hexagram of Sequence
 Nuclear (Mutual) Hexagram (hu gua) (is found by taking the inner lines of a hexagram; given that the original hexagram's lines are labeled 1 through 6 from bottom up, the nuclear hexagram contains the lines 2, 3, 4, 3, 4, 5)
 Hexagram of Change (bian gua)
 Internal Hexagram (nei gua)
 External Hexagram (wai gua)

Sequences
The most commonly known sequence is the King Wen sequence. A totally different sequence was found in the Mawangdui Silk Texts. The hexagrams are also found in the Binary sequence, also known as Fu Xi sequence or Shao Yong sequence.

Lookup table

See also
List of hexagrams of the I Ching
Feng shui
Tai Yi Shen Shu
Tie Ban Shen Shu

References

I Ching
Symbolism